Gargeyapuram is a village in Kurnool district, Andhra Pradesh, India. It is 12 km from Kurnool city towards Srisailam. One can only reach the village by road.

References 

Villages in Kurnool district